Stephen Holder (born 1939) is a British philatelist who was invited to sign the Roll of Distinguished Philatelists in 2016. Holder is a former dealer in philatelic literature as HH Sales and a specialist in the philately of the Franco-Prussian War and Siege of Paris. He has also formed an award-winning collection of Alsace-Lorraine.

References 

Living people
1939 births
Signatories to the Roll of Distinguished Philatelists
British philatelists